Yerliane Glamar Moreno Hernández (born 13 October 2000) is a Venezuelan professional footballer who plays as a midfielder for Spanish Liga F club UD Granadilla Tenerife and the Venezuela women's national team.

International career
Moreno represented Venezuela at the 2016 South American U-17 Women's Championship and the 2016 FIFA U-17 Women's World Cup. At senior level, she played the 2018 Central American and Caribbean Games.

References

2000 births
Living people
Venezuelan women's footballers
Women's association football midfielders
Women's association football forwards
UD Granadilla Tenerife players
Venezuela women's international footballers
Venezuelan expatriate women's footballers
Venezuelan expatriate sportspeople in Colombia
Expatriate women's footballers in Colombia
Venezuelan expatriate sportspeople in Spain
People from Guasdualito
Expatriate women's footballers in Spain
Primera División (women) players